South Korea participated in the 2012 Asian Beach Games in Haiyang, China on 16–22 June 2012.

Korea sent 46 athletes which will compete in 6 sports.

Medal summary

Medals table

References

External links 

Nations at the 2012 Asian Beach Games
2012
Asian Beach Games